"Manuela" is a song by Greek singer Demis Roussos from his 1974 German-language album Auf Wiedersehn. It was also released also as a single (in 1974 on Philips Records).

Background and writing 
The song was written by Klaus Munro and Leo Leandros. The recording was produced by Leo Leandros.

Commercial performance 
The song reached no. 42 in Germany.

Track listing 
7" single Philips 6009 555 (November 1974, Germany, Austria)
 A. "Manuela" (3:45)
 B. "Addio" (3:37)

Charts

References

External links 

 Demis Roussos — "Manuela" at Discogs

1974 songs
1974 singles
Demis Roussos songs
Philips Records singles
Songs written by Leo Leandros

Song recordings produced by Leo Leandros